Taos National Forest was established as the Taos Forest Reserve by the U.S. Forest Service in New Mexico on November 7, 1906 with . It became a National Forest on March 4, 1907. On July 1, 1908 the entire forest was combined with part of Jemez National Forest to create Carson National Forest and the name was discontinued.

References

External links
Forest History Society
Listing of the National Forests of the United States and Their Dates (from Forest History Society website) Text from Davis, Richard C., ed. Encyclopedia of American Forest and Conservation History. New York: Macmillan Publishing Company for the Forest History Society, 1983. Vol. II, pp. 743-788.

Carson National Forest
Former National Forests of New Mexico
History of Taos County, New Mexico
National Forest